Bonfils is a surname of French origin, meaning "good son". Notable people with the surname include:

Félix Bonfils (1831–1885), French photographer and writer
Marie-Lydie Cabanis Bonfils (1837–1918), French photographer
Frederick Gilmer Bonfils (1860–1933), American publisher, owner of the Denver Post
Robert Bonfils (French designer) (1886–1972)
Helen Bonfils (1889–1972), American philanthropist and supporter of the arts, daughter of Frederick Gilmer Bonfils
Robert Bonfils (American illustrator) (1922–2018)
Khan Bonfils (1972–2015), Vietnam-born Danish actor and performer who mainly worked in Britain
Winifred Bonfils (1863–1936), American journalist

See also
Monfils (surname)

References